Monardella lanceolata is a species of flowering plant in the mint family known by the common names mustang mint and mustang monardella. It is native to the mountains of California and Baja California, where it grows in chaparral, woodland, rocky slopes, and often disturbed habitat types.

Description
Monardella lanceolata is variable in appearance and sometimes divided into a number of indistinct varieties. In general, it is an annual herb producing a branching, purple stem with a coat of glandular hairs. The lance-shaped leaves are 3 or 4 centimeters long and oppositely arranged about the stem.

The inflorescence is a head of several flowers blooming in a cup of hairy, pointed, purple-tinged bracts. The flowers are purple in color and roughly 1.5 centimeters long.

External links
 Calflora Database: Monardella breweri ssp. lanceolata  (Mustang mint) — current classification of Monardella lanceolata.
Jepson Manual eFlora treatment of Monardella breweri ssp. lanceolata — current classification of Monardella lanceolata.
USDA Plants Profile: Monardella lanceolata
Monardella lanceolata - Photo gallery

lanceolata
Flora of California
Flora of Baja California
Flora of the Sierra Nevada (United States)
Natural history of the California chaparral and woodlands
Natural history of the Peninsular Ranges
Natural history of the Transverse Ranges
Flora without expected TNC conservation status